Qartaba (Syriac: ܩܪܛܒܐ, also spelled Kartaba or Artaba) is a town in the mountains of the Byblos District of the Keserwan-Jbeil Governorate, Lebanon. It is located 57 kilometers north Beirut on the mountains above Byblos at an average altitude of 1,250 meters. Qartaba is surrounded by olive groves, apple orchards, and vineyards.

Etymology

In Syriac, Qartaba means either the good place (ܟܘܪ ܛܒܐ) or the nice chillness (ܩܪܛܒܐ) reflecting its good, curing, and balanced weather. The town is often referred to as Byblos' Bride.

History
Qartaba was once considered an important village in the Byblos highland, a trade point for surrounding villages. Silk manufacturing flourished and in 1918, seven factories employed more than 500 people and much of the silk was exported to Lyon, France.

Archeology

A column carved into the facade of two temples, with statues of members of an elite Roman family was discovered in 1940 in Qartaba, near Saint Sarkis and Bacchus Monastery. It is estimated that the statues were buried between 120 and 160 CE.

Written under the statues in Greek are the names of the family members: "Abd al-Latus", "Meli", "Cassia" and "Germanus".

Men's clothing reflects the influence of Roman dress, unlike women's clothing, which reflects local tradition.

"Germanus" appears to have been a priest, wearing the flat hat of a Phoenician priest, with a sprinkler in his hand for religious rituals. Germanus is still a family name present in Qartaba and is also used as a first name, particularly in Mazraat es-Siyad.

As for "Abd al-Latus", he bears the name of a goddess whose honor was associated with the Arabs. And the names "Germanus" and "Cassia" reflect the Roman influence in the area.

The statues are now located in the National Museum of Beirut.

Demographics
The inhabitants of Qartaba are predominantly Maronite Catholics. As of 2009, the religious make-up of the Qartaba's 6309 voters were roughly 99% Maronite Catholics (6247 voters), 0.8% Melkite Catholics (50 voters) and 0.2% Greek Orthodox (12 voters).

The main families of Qartaba are: Acar, Atallah, Beyrouthy, Challita, Gharios, Karam, Khoury, Sakr, Sawaya, Sokhen and Soueid.

Climate

Places Of Worship
There are around 19 places of Christian worship in Qartaba, including churches, monasteries, and shrines, such as:

Monasteries

• Saint Sarkis and Bakhos Monastery, built in 1536 when the children of Sheikh Gerges fled from Aqoura to Qartaba, carrying with them the image of the two holy martyrs, Sergius and Bacchus. In cooperation with the townspeople, they built a church in the name of the aforementioned saints, which was exposed to fire and rebuilt in 1717. In the year 1815, the people of Qartaba, by a deed, presented the Church with its livelihood and property as an “eternal endowment” to the Lebanese Maronite Order, to set up a school next to it to “teach children reading, Christian education, guidance, and service of spiritual matters free of charge.” And that was through an agreement with General Father Ignatius Blebel and with the approval of Bishop Germanos Tabet. The Order agreed and completed the construction of the school in a short time. And it worked to buy the lands adjacent to it to expand the construction so that it later became a legal monastery in 1823.

Cathedrals

• Cathedral of Saint Elias, which was built in the middle of the 16th century and restored in 1556, was rebuilt twice in 1846 and 1903. Its architecture is according to a basilical plan with three naves and three altars. The cathedral holds many 19th-century paintings by Kanan Dib and Daoud Corm and is decorated by stained glass windows. The exterior of the cathedral is decorated with a bell tower with a clock.

Churches

• Church of Our Lady of Herezmeny, which was built in 1827 when the Karam family moved from Yanouh to Qartaba. The family made a deal with the sheikhs of the Hamade family to build a church in the Herezmeny land where stood some Roman ruins. In the late 19th century a vault was added to the main building that ended up with an L shape.

• Church of Saint Joseph, which was built in 1898 when Joseph Rafael Jabbour gave the land of Al Malaha to build a church.

• Church of Saint Teddy, which was built in 1607 when the family of the priest Teddy came to Qartaba from Edessa. It was built upon a parcel of land that was donated by the Hamade sheikhs. It is the only church in Lebanon dedicated to Saint Teddy. The church was rebuilt in 1868 and restored in 2004.

• Church of Saint Georges, which was built as a private chapel for the family of Moufarrej Geryes in the late 19th century and was restored in 2022, it is located in Haret El Tahta street.

• Church of Our Lady of the Annunciation

• Church of Saint Challita - Hjarta, built in 1925.

• Church of Sainte Thérèse

• Church of Saint Semaan Al Aamoudy

• Church of Saint Charbel - Al khalle

• Church of Saint Charbel - Charbineh

• Church of Saint Charbel - Chmis street

• Church of Saint Elias - Hsayya

• Church of Our Lady of Tenderness

• Church of Sainte Rita - Hjarta

Some Shrines may include:

• Shrine of Our Lady of Peace

• Shrine of Saint Challita

• Shrine of Sainte Veronica Giuliani

Carnivals

Kartaba Carnival is a traditional and annual event in the town of Qartaba, which is organized by "The Qartaba Touristic and Traditional festivals" committee and is supported by the Municipality of Qartaba. It is attended by political, military, judicial, religious people and social media figures, in addition to presidents of municipalities and personalities of the town and the area of the Jbeil District. The carnival first started in the 1960s, and is still held to this day in the square of the village, with the attendance of people coming from all regions. The townspeople, of all ages, participate and cooperate together to create exhibition boards that combine traditional Lebanese music, art and culture. This event is free of charge. The carnival ends with a musical evening held by Lebanese artists.

Institutions

Some of the most important and active official institutions in Qartaba are:

Educational
  
• Don Bosco School, the first school established by the Salesian Sisters of Don Bosco in Lebanon.

• El Saydé School, which was a private school run by the Sisters of Ibreen, and then turned into a mixed public high school.

Others

• The municipality of Qartaba which was established in 1894.

• (ABK)  "الجمعيّة الخيّرية القرطباويّة", which was established in 1927, and is one of the first charitable societies in Lebanon that still exists, and that practices and supports the Qartabian society in various fields (medical, health, educational, and social).

• Brotherhood of the Heart of Jesus

• Brotherhood of the Immaculate Conception

• Court of First Class

• Center for the internal security forces

• Governmental Hospital

• Civil Defense Center

Notable People

• Dr. Fares Souaid, politician, former MP and Secretariat General Coordinator of the March 14 Alliance.

• Nouhad Souaid, former MP.

• Joseph Sakr, singer and stage actor.

• Adel Karam, actor, comedian, and TV presenter.

• Dr. Bechara Khoury, president of Notre Dame University-Louaize.

• Rachel Karam, senior reporter.

• Jean Nakhoul, journalist and executive producer.

• Nadim Cherfan, choreographer and founder of The Mayyas.

References

External links
Kartaba - Byblos' Bride

Populated places in Byblos District
Maronite Christian communities in Lebanon